Intrada is an American record company based in Oakland, California, owned and managed by Douglass Fake.  <div>The company specializes in movie and television soundtracks, notably those by the late Jerry Goldsmith.

Intrada was founded in 1985 by owner Douglass Fake in San Francisco, California. It relocated to Oakland, California at the turn of the millennium and expanded operations, increasing the volume of albums released and adding Roger Feigelson as Director of Business Operations. In addition to standard releases, Intrada features The Excalibur Collection, a series of world premiere re-recordings of film scores, reconstructed and performed by orchestras. Intrada has a series of limited edition soundtracks, produced in cooperation with film studios and the American Federation of Musicians. Intrada also operates as a retail store selling their own releases in addition to other labels. Combined, the Intrada record label and store is the largest independent business dedicated to the music of the movies, television and games.

CD releases

Current categories
Intrada Special Collection Series

Intrada MAF/INT (Mary Ann Fake)

Intrada Signature Editions

Disney/Intrada Series

Former categories

Intrada RVF (Regina Victoria Fake)

Intrada FMT (Film Music Treasures)

Intrada VJF (Veronica Jeanne Fake)

LP releases

External links
Intrada Records
 
Interview : Roger Feigelson, producer for Intrada Records

American record labels
Soundtrack record labels
1985 establishments in California
Record labels established in 1985
Companies based in Oakland, California
American companies established in 1985